Kamala Saikhom is an Indian actress who predominantly appeared in Manipuri films. She was a resident of Uripok, Imphal, Manipur. Besides acting in films, she had also produced two movies Nangsu Mouni and Kadarmapee. She had acted in more than 120 Manipuri films.
She married an Army officer, Avinash from Agra, Uttar Pradesh in 2012.

Career
She started acting in music video albums and then to films. Among her famous films, Sakthibee Tampha, Natephamda Tero, Ayukki Likla, Khuji, Aabirkhan, Ta-Tomba the Great, Khujingee Mami, Kangla Karabar and Minambagi Phajaba may be mentioned.

In Sakthibee Tampha and Africa Leishabi, she played the roles of dark skinned ladies, Tampha and Bina respectively. Her role of Tampha in Sakthibee Tampha was well received by audiences. Saikhom played a tongue stammered woman in the movie Natephamda Tero. In the movie Ashit Awanthada Pee Thadoi Ahum, she played the role of a poet. She played Bengali and Bihari ladies in Leeklam and Kangla Karabar respectively.

Minambagi Phajaba, released on 9 August 2012, is her last film released till date, even though shooting of the film completed some years before the release. Her last film shootings were of Africa Leishabi and Khujingee Mami.

Selected filmography

References

External links
 

Indian film actresses
Living people
Meitei people
People from Imphal
Actresses from Manipur
Actresses in Meitei cinema
21st-century Indian actresses
1987 births